Tuadook River is a Canadian river in Northumberland County, New Brunswick. The river drains northeastward from Holmes Lake and Tuadook Lake into the Little Southwest Miramichi River. The name is derived from the original Mi'kmaq name for the Little Southwest Miramichi River

See also
List of rivers of New Brunswick

References

Rivers of New Brunswick
Landforms of Northumberland County, New Brunswick